Mazu is a goddess worshipped in China, Taiwan, and Southeast Asia.

Mazu may also refer to:
 Matsu Islands, also spelled Mazu
 Mazu Daoyi (709–788), master of Chan Buddhism
 Mazu (TV series), 2012 Chinese mythology fantasy television series starring Liu Tao, Stephen Wong Ka-lok, and Yan Kuan

Iran
 Mazu, Fars, a village in Fars Province, Iran
 Istgah-e Mazu, a village in Khuzestan Province, Iran
 Mazu, Iran, a village in Khuzestan Province, Iran
 Mazu Rural District, an administrative subdivision of Khuzestan Province, Iran

See also
 Matsu (disambiguation)